Devil's Pool is a natural pool in a treacherous stretch of Babinda Creek where large granite boulders fill the creek bed. It is one of the main attractions of the Babinda Boulders scenic reserve, near Babinda, Queensland, Australia.

In 2005, the Australia TV program Message Stick gave an account of the Pool through many interviews and testimonies of witnesses to investigate the prevalence of deaths of young male travellers over the years. The pools have taken approximately 20 lives since 1959. The local council urges visitors to stay within a designated swimming area to be safe.

Indigenous legend

The Devil's Pool is the site of the local indigenous tribe's legend, which states how the Babinda Boulders were formed.

The tale is about Oolana, a young woman from the Yindinji Tribe. After being promised to a respected tribal elder, she met a handsome young warrior called Dyga from another tribe and fell in love. They fled their tribes and escaped into the wilderness to continue their affair. Elders searched for them and they were captured. Dyga was dragged away. Oolana escaped and was in despair. She threw herself into the Devil's Pools and her anguished cries turned into the pools torrents. 

Locals believe that Oolana's spirit still haunts the Devils Pools, pulling young men to their untimely deaths.

Incidents

A sign warns of the dangers of swimming there because the water is deep and fast flowing through channels and over underwater rocks but deaths still occur – some by swimming, others by falling in unexpectedly, many being wedged in a rock "chute". 
On 30 November 2008, Tasmanian naval seaman James Bennett became the 17th person to drown at the site since 1959. In 2010 the Cairns Regional Council produced a report which was cited by the coroner examining the death of a man in that year at the Devil's Pool, stating that the number of deaths there totalled 17. In October 2020 the Australian Broadcasting Corporation reported that the number of known drownings at this site in the past 50 years stood at 20.

References

Landforms of Far North Queensland
Tourist attractions in Far North Queensland
Swimming venues in Australia
Bathing in Australia
Natural pools
Babinda